Robert Whitcomb is an American editor and writer.

Biography
Whitcomb in the summer of 1969 worked at The Boston Record American, a tabloid. He moved to The Boston Herald Traveler in 1970 for a full-time job. 

He left Dartmouth College in 1970 with a BA in History, before graduating with an MS in journalism at Columbia University two years later.   

Whitcomb was an editor at The Wall Street Journal, the International Herald Tribune, and then vice president and editorial page editor of the Providence Journal. He was also the member secretary of the Aga Khan University Media Thinking Group.

He's editor of newenglanddiary.com, a weekly columnist for GoLocal24.com and chairman of The Boston Guardian. He has written many articles for national magazines.  

See: https://newenglanddiary.com/

and:

https://www.golocalprov.com/

and:

https://read.thebostonguardian.com/the-boston-guardian

Writings
Whitcomb co-authored Cape Wind, an environmental and social-comedy book about Cape Wind, a planned offshore wind park in Nantucket Sound, and has edited and written parts of other books, including fiction and nonfiction.

He is married to the painter Nancy Spears.

http://nancyspearswhitcomb.com/

References

External links
 Newen Gland Diary Retrieved 13 March 2018
 https://newenglanddiary.com/
 Globalist, The Globalist (December 3, 2007), "Robert Whitcomb, Editorial Page Editor, Providence Journal."
 Glimpse Foundation, Glimpse Foundation (December 3, 2007), "Robert Whitcomb." Retrieved 13 March 2018.
 Bob Whitcomb's education 

Year of birth missing (living people)
Living people
International Herald Tribune people
American male journalists
The Providence Journal people
Dartmouth College alumni
Columbia University Graduate School of Journalism alumni